This is a recap of the 1969 season for the Professional Bowlers Association (PBA) Tour.  It was the tour's 11th season, and consisted of 35 events. Billy Hardwick won six titles on the 1969 Tour (also adding a seventh in the BPAA All-Star, which was not part of the Tour at the time), and won the Sporting News PBA Player of the Year award.  Mike McGrath won the PBA National Championship, while Jim Godman took the title in the Firestone Tournament of Champions.

Johnny Guenther rolled the PBA's second-ever televised 300 game in a semi-final match at the San Jose Open on February 1, 1969, before going on to win the tournament.

Tournament schedule

References

External links
1969 Season Schedule

Professional Bowlers Association seasons
1969 in bowling